Uetersen (formerly known as Ütersen (Holstein)) is a town in the district of Pinneberg, in Schleswig-Holstein, Germany. Uetersen is home to the Rosarium Uetersen, the oldest and largest rose garden in Northern Germany, created in 1929.

Name
The name of the city Uetersen, "utmost end", probably arose because it is "at the extreme end", referring to the fact that its location is at the transition to the geest Seestermüher marsh. But there is also the suspicion that the name of "Ütersteen" showing what "ultra-stone" or "Ütristina", the old name of Pinnau originates.

Mayors since 1870

Number of inhabitants

1803: 2601
1855: 3906
1871: 4037 
1905: 6300 
1935: 7236
1951: 15485 
1995: 18155
2007: 17852
2008: 17739 
2009: 17688 
2010: 17558
2011: 17829

Coat of arms
Blazon:In a red shield is a silver (= white) gate without any door. The wall has six pinnacles. There is a silver (= white) tower on each side, having two windows each and topped by silver (= white) triangular roofs. Between the towers there is the nettle-leaf of the Counts of Holstein. In the open door at the base there stands a silver (= white) S-shaped object, which might show Virgin Mary and Jesus, standing upon a golden (= yellow) lying moon crescent and flanked by two golden (= yellow) stars on a red background. Below the door is a blue field probably symbolizing water.

Notable people

Known Uetersener
A list of people who were born in Uetersen, live or have lived and work in the town or have been involved with it.

 Metta von Oberg (1737–1794), baronesse
 Augusta Louise zu Stolberg-Stolberg (1753–1835), penfriend of Johann Wolfgang von Goethe
 Detlef Lienau, (1818–1887), architect
 Ludwig Meyn, (1820–1878), agricultural scientist and geologist
 Friedrich Neelsen (1854–1898), pathologist and scientist
 Arthur Drews, (1865–1935), writer and philosopher
 Kurt Roth (1899–1975), painter
 Werner Lange (1917–1979), Mühlenkaufmann, inherited the  site of the Langenmühle to the city of Uetersen
 Willi Gerdau (1929–2011), footballer of the national team of 1957
 Hermann Stehr (1937–1993), German sculptor and painter
 Malte Schöning (1995–2015), songwriter

More people who are closely linked to Uetersen
These people have lived in Uetersen or are closely linked to the town. They have contributed to the reputation of the town or to the general welfare of the population.
Helmuth Karl Bernhard von Moltke (1800–1891)

International relations

Uetersen is twinned with:
  Wittstock, Ostprignitz-Ruppin district of  Brandenburg.

Literature 
Rudolf Lavorenz: Uetersen,   (de)
Theodor von Kobbe: Die Schweden im Kloster zu Uetersen (1830)  (de)
Carl Bulcke: Silkes Liebe (1906) (Fate of the Roman society Uetersener)  (de)
Elsa Plath-Langheinrich: Als Goethe nach Uetersen schrieb   (de)
Johann Wolfgang von Goethe: Briefe an Augusta Louise zu Stolberg  (de)
Goethes Briefe ins holsteinische Kloster Uetersen   (de)
Lothar Mosler: Blickpunkt Uetersen (Geschichte und Geschichten 1234 - 1984) (1985)  (de)
Lothar Mosler: Mit der Eisenbahn durch Uetersen (1996)  (de)
Lothar Mosler: Rosenstadt Uetersen im Wandel der Zeiten (1971)  (de)
Dr. Ernst Brütt und Gerhard Scharfenstein: Uetersen und seine Einwohner (1995)  (de)
Andreas Fründt: Das Hochadeliche Closter zu Uetersen (1986)  (de)
Michael Schubert: Uetersen zwischen Marsch und Geest (1998)   (de)

References

 
Towns in Schleswig-Holstein
Pinneberg (district)